Muqur may refer to:

Muqur, Oman, a town in Oman
Muqur District, Ghazni, a district in Ghazni Province, Afghanistan
Muqur, Ghazni, a town in Muqur District, Ghazni
Muqur District, Badghis, a district in Badghis Province, Afghanistan
Mugului, the founder of Rouran tribe